Unsolved (also titled Unsolved: The Murders of Tupac and the Notorious B.I.G.) is an American true crime drama anthology television miniseries. The miniseries is based on the 1996 murder of Tupac Shakur and the 1997 murder of The Notorious B.I.G. (aka Biggie Smalls). It premiered February 27, 2018 on USA Network. The 10-episode miniseries chronicles the dual police investigations of Detective Greg Kading (Josh Duhamel) and Detective Russell Poole (Jimmi Simpson) into the controversial murders of two of the rap industry's most legendary players, Tupac (Marcc Rose) and Biggie (Wavyy Jonez).

Cast
Wavyy Jonez as The Notorious B.I.G.
Marcc Rose as Tupac Shakur
Josh Duhamel as Detective Greg Kading
Jimmi Simpson as Detective Russell Poole
Bokeem Woodbine as Officer Daryn Dupree
Jamie McShane as Detective Fred Miller
Brent Sexton as Detective Brian Tyndall
Wendell Pierce as Detective Lee Tucker
Luke James as Sean Combs
Aisha Hinds as Voletta Wallace
LeToya Luckett as Sharitha Golden 
Donald Faison as Jacques Agnant
Woody McClain as Jimmy Henchman
Maestro Harrell as Lil' Cease
Funkmaster Flex as himself
Lahmard Tate as Duane Davis
Mychal Thompson as Orlando Anderson
Rhys Coiro as Jim Black
Nakia Burrise as Sharon Gower
Dominic L. Santana as Suge Knight
Sola Bamis as Afeni Shakur
Amirah Vann as Justine Simon
Jamie Hector as Keefe D's lawyer

Episodes

Development
The series was ordered on May 12, 2017. Emmy winner Anthony Hemingway directed the pilot and will executive produce the series, along with Mark Taylor through their Hemingway-Taylor production company. Kyle Long wrote the pilot and will also executive produce. Greg Kading, who will also serve as co-executive producer, led multiple law-enforcement task forces investigating the murders and authored the book Murder Rap: The Untold Story of Biggie Smalls & Tupac Shakur Murder Investigations.

Reception

Critical response
On the review aggregation website Rotten Tomatoes, the series holds an approval rating of 73% based on 26 reviews, with an average rating of 5.93/10. The website's critical consensus reads, "Unsolved's prestige aspirations don't always work in its procedural structure, but strong performances and an ambitious spirit to find truth in this real-world mystery create an engaging exploration of two of pop culture's most notorious influences." Metacritic, which uses a weighted average, assigned the series a score of 67 out of 100 based on 16 reviews, indicating "generally favorable reviews."

Ratings

References

External links
Official website at USA Network

Greg Kading
Anthony Hemingway
Russell Poole

2010s American drama television series
2018 American television series debuts
2018 American television series endings
Bloods
Crips
English-language television shows
USA Network original programming
Serial drama television series
Television series by Universal Content Productions
2010s American anthology television series
Cultural depictions of Tupac Shakur
Works about Tupac Shakur